Yōko Akino (秋野 暢子 Akino Yōko, born Yōko Tashiro, 田代 暢子 Tashiro Yōko, born 18 January 1957 in Osaka, Japan) is a Japanese actress.

Selected filmography
Film

Television

References

External links
 Talent Agency Official Website (in Japanese)

1957 births
Living people
Japanese actresses
Asadora lead actors
People from Osaka